Alec Hunter Academy (formerly Alec Hunter High School and Alec Hunter Humanities College) is a secondary school with  academy status located in East Braintree, Essex, England.

History
The school opened as a technical school in 1959, and it was named after the weaver and textile designer Alec Hunter (died 1958). It had become a humanities college by 2009, when the school celebrated its 50th anniversary. In that year, local historian David Possee was writing a book on the history of the school when he died; however Braintree Museum hosted an exhibition about the school. In 2013 the school converted to an Academy by joining Saffron Academy Trust and is now part of a family of schools/academies under Saffron Academy Trust.

Alec Hunter 
Alec Butler Hunter was born in 1899 in Haslemere.  He was educated at St George’ School, Harpenden and after two terms at Wadham College, Oxford, served in the army to the end of the First World War. On leaving the army he joined his Father, Edmund Hunter, at St Edmondsbury Weaving Works at Letchworth. His Father, a textile designer, had established a workshop in the high tradition of Spitalfields silk weaving in Haslemere in 1901, before moving to Letchworth in 1908.  Alec Hunter had thus been born into the art and craft of weaving and had assimilated from an early age that sense of quality and design, which he developed with such distinction throughout his life.

His first aspirations were to be an artist and in 1925 he attended the Byam Shaw School of Art and throughout his life found time to draw and paint in his spare time.  This talent put him in good stead for his work as a textile designer. During the time in Letchworth he developed a great interest in Morris Dancing and after he married in 1921, Alec and his wife Margaret formed the Letchworth Folk Dancing group.  As a result they became friends of the then Vicar of Thaxted, Conrad Noel.  In 1934, Alec became Founder Squire of the Morris Ring.

In 1927 the two Hunters moved to Edinburgh, where they started the Edinburgh Weavers under Sir James Morton.  Here Alec Hunter worked, producing some of the finest truly contemporary fabrics to be woven in this country this century.  One design, “Dunoon” was used for furnishing Broadcasting House in London in 1932.

The Edinburgh Weavers were affected by the economic downturn and were merged with Sir James Morton’s larger company – Morton Sundour. Alec was asked to move to Carlisle but felt that he needed to move on and so in 1932 he joined Warner and Sons, becoming manager of their Braintree factory and later a Director.  It was at this time that Warner’s introduced some really contemporary designs to their range of fabrics, many of which were woven on power looms instead of the traditional handlooms.

Thus his work at Warner’s, Braintree stretched over more than 25 years. Here he found the ideal environment for developing his great skill in blending design to the textures he evolved from the old and new fibres.  His enjoyment of this work never left him and he brought to the challenge of new developments that appreciation of fine quality which he had absorbed from his youth.  During the 1930s he produced, with outstanding success, contemporary furnishing fabrics using many new yarns.  In this field he was, indeed, ahead of his time and his foresight and invention were later apparent from his many imitators in the period after the Second World War

Besides creating beautiful modern fabrics, he was responsible for producing many of the lovely traditional silk damasks and brocades woven by his firm for the Coronation Services in Westminster Abbey of King George VI and Queen Elizabeth II in 1937 and 1953 respectively.

His full life included many activities and he was honoured by many Associations and Societies. He was the first Squire of the Morris Ring, an association of Morris Dancing Clubs, and he was, for many years, a member of the English Folk Dance and Song Society.  He was President of the Braintree and District Textile Society and Chairman of the Governors of Margaret Tabor Secondary School.

Alec Hunter was a kind and happy man, generous in praise and happiest when he could bestow it. His sympathy, his high ideals and easy friendship were, at once,  apparent to all fortunate enough to meet and know him. 

Alec Hunter did much for the young student and technologist in textiles.  This is exemplified by his work at the Royal College of Art, his membership of the Education Committee of the Silk and Rayon Users’ Association and his membership of the Bursaries Board of the Royal Society of Arts.

It was fitting that with Alec’s interest in education that the new school in Braintree be given his name, but such a pity that he died in 1958, a year before the school bearing his name opened.  Over 60 years later Alec Hunter’s influence lives on with the school tie being based on a fabric design by Alec Hunter named “Cressing”.

Inspection judgements

As of 2021, the school's most recent Ofsted judgement was in 2017, when it was judged Good overall.

Notable former pupils
Keith Flint, dancer and vocalist of the big beat band The Prodigy
Liam Howlett, member of the British band The Prodigy, occasional DJ, and record producer
Andy Overall, vocalist and songwriter of band Blue Zoo

References

Further reading
  (Contains information on the history of the Alec Hunter School)

External links
  (Background and life of Alec Hunter)

1959 establishments in England
Academies in Essex
Educational institutions established in 1959
Secondary schools in Essex
Braintree, Essex